Rock Jolly is a historic house near Cross Plains, Tennessee, U.S..

The house was built circa 1830 for William Johnson, a farmer. The origin of the name is unknown. It has been owned by the Buntin family since 1939; they descend from settler James Robertson and early Nashville mayor Joseph Thorpe Elliston.

The house was designed in the Federal architectural style. It has been listed on the National Register of Historic Places since October 30, 1973.

References

Houses on the National Register of Historic Places in Tennessee
Federal architecture in Tennessee
Houses completed in 1830
National Register of Historic Places in Robertson County, Tennessee